The following lists events that happened during 1944 in New Zealand.

Population
 Estimated population as of 31 December: 1,676,300
 Increase since 31 December 1943: 34,300 (2.09%)
 Males per 100 females: 94.3

Incumbents

Regal and viceregal
Head of State – George VI
Governor-General – Marshal of the Royal Air Force Sir Cyril Newall GCB OM GCMG CBE AM

Government
The 27th New Zealand Parliament commenced, with the Labour Party in government.

Speaker of the House – Bill Schramm (Labour)
Prime Minister – Peter Fraser
Minister of Finance – Walter Nash
Minister of Foreign Affairs – Peter Fraser
Attorney-General – Rex Mason
Chief Justice – Sir Michael Myers

Parliamentary opposition 
 Leader of the Opposition –  Sidney Holland (National Party).

Main centre leaders
Mayor of Auckland – John Allum
Mayor of Hamilton – Harold Caro
Mayor of Wellington – Thomas Hislop then Will Appleton
Mayor of Christchurch – Ernest Andrews
Mayor of Dunedin – Andrew Allen then Donald Cameron

Events 

 21 January – New Zealand and Australia sign the Canberra Pact in which they agree to cooperate on international affairs.
 15 March – New Zealand General Freyberg orders the destruction of the monastery at Cassino using 775 aircraft, 1250 tons of bombs, and 200,000 shells. At the end of the battle, New Zealand has lost 1050 men, one of the worst days in its history.
 March – Meat rationing is introduced, with an allowance of 1/9 to 2/- per person per week.
 October US Navy closes US Naval Base New Zealand
 31 October – Refugees from Eastern Poland, 800 including 734 orphaned children, arrive in New Zealand via Siberia and Iran.
 The New Zealand head tax on Chinese immigrants from 1881 (63 years) is repealed.

Arts and literature

See 1944 in art, 1944 in literature

Music

See: 1944 in music

Radio

See: Public broadcasting in New Zealand

Film

See: :Category:1944 film awards, 1944 in film, List of New Zealand feature films, Cinema of New Zealand, :Category:1944 films

Sport

Archery
National Champions (Postal Shoot)
Open: W. Burton (Gisborne)
Women: R. Mitchell (Dunedin)

Chess
 The 51st National Chess Championship was held in Wellington, and was won by R.G. Wade of Wellington.

Cricket

Horse racing

Harness racing
 New Zealand Trotting Cup – Bronze Eagle
 Auckland Trotting Cup – Betty Boop

Lawn bowls
The national outdoor lawn bowls championships are held in Dunedin.
 Men's singles champion – M.J. Squire (Hawera Bowling Club)
 Men's pair champions – P.H. Edwards, E.W. Travers (skip) (St Kilda Bowling Club)
 Men's fours champions – W. Chapman, A.E. Seymour, J.A. Whyte, C.G. Spearman (skip) (Christchurch RSA Bowling Club)

Rugby union

 Ranfurly Shield: Held by Southland (uncontested due to World War II)

Rugby league
New Zealand national rugby league team

Soccer
 Chatham Cup competition not held
 Provincial league champions:
	Auckland:	Metro College
	Canterbury:	Thistle
	Hawke's Bay:	Napier HSOB
	Nelson:	No competition
	Otago:	Mosgiel
	South Canterbury:	No competition
	Southland:	No competition
	Taranaki:	Old Boys
	Waikato:	Rotowaro
	Wanganui:	No competition
	Wellington:	Waterside

Births
 4 January: Alan Sutherland, rugby player (died 2020)
 7 February: Witi Ihimaera, author
 4 March: Brian Turner, sportsman and writer
 6 March: Kiri Te Kanawa, opera singer
 8 April: Tariana Turia, politician
 12 May: Barry Barclay, filmmaker (died 2008)
 16 June: Robin Morrison, photographer (died 1993)
 17 July: Mark Burgess, cricketer
 22 July: Anand Satyanand, Judge, Ombudsman and 19th Governor-General of New Zealand
 29 July: Terrence Jarvis, cricketer
 17 August: Philip Woollaston, politician
 26 August: Neroli Fairhall, archer (died 2006)
 30 August: Alex Wyllie, rugby union player and coach
 7 October: Jack Body, composer (died 2015)
 10 November: Andy Leslie, rugby union player and administrator
 18 November: David O'Sullivan, cricketer
 Noel Anderson, Judge (died 2021)
 Philip Culbertson, theologian
 Keith Locke, environmentalist and politician
 John Wood, diplomat
 J. S. Parker, painter (died 2017)

Deaths
 18 June Arthur Bignell, businessman, mayor. 
 21 July: John Andrew MacPherson, politician.
 12 August: James Hargest, National MP, killed while serving with NZ Army as observer with British forces in Normandy.
 30 August: Thomas William Rhodes, politician.
 30 October: Haami Tokouru Ratana, politician and Ratana church leader.
 2 December: Frank Milner, headmaster and educationalist.
 29 December: John Cobbe, politician.
 29 December: Henry Holland, mayor of Christchurch.

See also
History of New Zealand
List of years in New Zealand
Military history of New Zealand
Timeline of New Zealand history
Timeline of New Zealand's links with Antarctica
Timeline of the New Zealand environment

References

External links

 
Years of the 20th century in New Zealand